UFC: Fight for the Troops 3 (also known as UFC Fight Night 31) was a mixed martial arts event held on November 6, 2013, at Fort Campbell in Fort Campbell, Kentucky. The event was broadcast live on Fox Sports 1.

Background
The event was the fourth that UFC hosted in cooperation with a US military base, following UFC Fight Night: Sanchez vs. Riggs in 2006, UFC: Fight for the Troops in 2008 and UFC: Fight for the Troops 2 in 2011.  Featured on the card were several United States Armed Forces military veterans including Tim Kennedy, Liz Carmouche, Colton Smith and Neil Magny.

A bout between George Roop and Francisco Rivera, previously linked to UFC 166 was moved to this event to bolster the card.

Nik Lentz was briefly scheduled to face Dennis Bermudez at the event.  However, Lentz was pulled from the pairing with Bermudez in favor of a bout with Chad Mendes on December 14, 2013 at UFC on Fox 9.  Bermudez then faced Steven Siler.

Derek Brunson was originally scheduled to face Antônio Braga Neto on this card.  However, Neto withdrew due to an injury and was replaced by UFC newcomer Brian Houston.

Tim Kennedy was expected to face Lyoto Machida in the event headliner.  However, Machida was pulled from the bout in favor of a matchup with Mark Muñoz on October 26, 2013 at UFC Fight Night 30, after Muñoz's original opponent, Michael Bisping was forced out of their bout with an injury. Kennedy instead faced Rafael Natal in the event headliner.

Results

Bonus awards
The following fighters were awarded $50,000 bonuses.

 Fight of the Night: Rustam Khabilov vs. Jorge Masvidal
 Knockout of the Night: Tim Kennedy
 Submission of the Night: Michael Chiesa

See also
List of UFC events
2013 in UFC

References

UFC Fight Night
2013 in mixed martial arts
Mixed martial arts in Kentucky
2013 in sports in Kentucky